The Kimball Island Midden Archeological Site is an archaeological site near Astor, Florida. It is located approximately seven miles southeast of Astor, within Ocala National Forest. On December 11, 1979, it was added to the U.S. National Register of Historic Places.

The archeological site is across the St. Johns River from the Lake Woodruff National Wildlife Refuge in Volusia County.

References

External links
 Lake County listings at National Register of Historic Places
 Lake County listings at Florida's Office of Cultural and Historical Programs

Mounds in Florida
Native American history of Florida
Archaeological sites in Florida
National Register of Historic Places in Lake County, Florida